Assa is a genus of frog in the family Myobatrachidae. These frogs are endemic to a few parts of eastern Australia.

Both species are found on a few mountains in Queensland and New South Wales. For a significant portion of time, the only species in this genus was the pouched frog (A. darlingtoni). However, a second species, A. wollumbin, was described in 2021 following a rangewide genetic survey of A. darlingtoni. Both species are notable in that the males have subcutaneous pouches on their hips in which they carry their tadpoles until they metamorphosize.

Species

References 

Taxa named by Michael J. Tyler
Myobatrachidae
Amphibian genera
Amphibians of Australia
Endemic fauna of Australia